Nicole, or Nicola Williams may refer to:

Nicola Williams (barrister), English Crown Court Judge since 2009
Nicole A. Williams (born 1977), American Democratic legislator in Maryland
Nicola Williams (soccer) (born 1982), Australian coach and former player
Nicole Williams (roller derby), (born 1983), American champion skater, a/k/a Bonnie Thunders